Hugo Martin Tetrode (7 March 1895, in Amsterdam – 18 January 1931, in Amstelveen) was a Dutch theoretical physicist who contributed to statistical physics, early quantum theory and quantum mechanics.

In 1912, Tetrode developed the Sackur–Tetrode equation, a quantum mechanical expression of the entropy of an ideal gas. Otto Sackur derived this equation independently around the same time. The Sackur–Tetrode constant, S0/R, is a fundamental physical constant representing the translational contribution to the entropy of an ideal gas at a temperature of 1 K and pressure of 100 kPa, where R is the gas constant.

From Amsterdam, Tetrode corresponded with Albert Einstein, Hendrik Lorentz and Paul Ehrenfest on quantum mechanics  and wrote several influential papers on quantum mechanics which were published in the German physics journal Zeitschrift für Physik.  In particular, the Machian notion that elementary particles only act on other elementary particles and not themselves was a key idea in the formulation of the Wheeler–Feynman time-symmetric theory.

Life
Hugo Tetrode was a member of the rich, prominent Tetrode family. He was the oldest of the three children of Pieter Johan Conrad Tetrode, who served as director of De Nederlandsche Bank (the Dutch national bank) from 1919 to 1934. Tetrode was born in what was then Nieuwer-Amstel, at an address that is now part of Amsterdam; as a child he lived on two of Amsterdam's canals.

Tetrode left for Germany in 1911 to study mathematics, physics and chemistry at the University of Leipzig, but returned to Amsterdam a year later. In 1912, at the age of 17, he published his first research paper in the German physics journal Annalen der Physik.  He published a total of six scientific papers, all on topics of statistical physics and quantum mechanics.

He led a withdrawn life; it is said that when Einstein and Ehrenfest tried to visit him in Amsterdam, Tetrode's maid sent them away: Meneer ontvangt geen gasten ("Sir is not receiving guests").

Tetrode died at the age of 35, unmarried, after contracting tuberculosis.

Publications
Die chemische Konstante der Gase und das elementare Wirkungsquantum, Annalen der Physik 38 (1912) 434-442, correctie Berichtigung zu meiner Arbeit: Die chemische Konstante der Gase und das elementare Wirkungsquantum in nr. 39 (1912) 255-256 
Bemerkungen über die Energieeinhalt einatomiger Gase und über die Quantentheorie für Flüssigkeiten, Physikalische Zeitschrift 14 (1913) 212-215 
Theoretical determination of the entropy constant of gases and liquids, Proc. Sect. Sci. Koninklijke Nederlandse Akademie Wet. Ser. B 17 (1914/1915) 1167-1184
Über den Wirkungszusammenhang der Welt. Eine Erweiterung der Klassischen Dynamik, Zeitschrift für Physik 10 (1922) 317-328 
Der Impuls-Energiesatz in der Diracschen Quantentheorie des Elektrons, Zeitschrift für Physik 49 (1928) 858-864
Allgemein-relativistische Quantentheorie des Elektrons, Zeitschrift für Physik 50 (1928) 336-346

See also
 Fokker-Tetrode dynamics
 Tetrode tensor
 Wheeler–Feynman absorber theory

References

Sources
 D. Dieks and W. J. Slooten, "Historic Papers in Physics – The Case of Hugo Martin Tetrode, 1895-1931",  Czechoslovak Journal of Physics B 36, 39-42 (1986)
  Prof. H.B.G. Casimir, "Hugo Martin Tetrode, een vergeten genie". NRC Handelsblad, February 23, 1984 (Dutch)
  Prof. H.B.G. Casimir, "Hugo Tetrode (1895-1931); een geniale outsider". Mens en Kosmos, Meulenhoff 1983, pag. 180-189 (Dutch)
 Frederik W. Wiegel, Introduction to Path-integral Methods in Physics and Polymer Science. World Scientific, 1986

20th-century Dutch physicists
Scientists from Amsterdam
1895 births
1931 deaths
Theoretical physicists